The Edward W. Bok Technical High School was a public high school in Philadelphia, Pennsylvania, designed by Irwin T. Catharine and named after Edward William Bok. It was completed in February 1938 by the Public Works Administration (WPA) as a vocational high school at 8th & Mifflin Streets.  As part of the Philadelphia Public Schools' Multiple Property Submission, the school was listed on the National Register of Historic Places in December, 1986. Bok High School was reorganized in 2006-2007 to prepare students for jobs in modern technology. After the 2012-2013 school year, the school was closed. In 2014, the school was renovated to become a home for over 200 businesses including restaurants, apartments, daycares, and hair salons.

History

The building was constructed from 1935-1938 based on the designs of Philadelphia School Board architect Irwin Catharine. The main body of the school is built of limestone-trimmed yellow brick, with a limestone low-rise section abutting the higher brick section. Piers and pilasters emphasize verticality in the Art Deco design. Carved cartouches show people at work. Classrooms adjoin one of two central light courts. At the time of its construction, the building represented a new trend in vocational education.  Rather than just teach carpentry skills, the school taught, and had dedicated space for, subjects such as brick laying, plastering, plumbing, machine building, tailoring, and hairdressing.

The school was named for Edward Bok (1863–1930), a Dutch born American editor and Pulitzer Prize-winning author, who edited the Ladies Home Journal for thirty years.

Following the school's 2013 closing, some of the classes moved into the South Philadelphia High School (SPHS or Southern) building, 5 blocks away, prior to the start of the 2013-14 school year. Bok was scheduled to merge with South Philadelphia High. The building itself remained open for maintenance & operational reasons for at least 1 additional heating season as the boilers supply heat to Southwark School across the street.

Sale and Redevelopment
In Summer 2014, Bok was put up for auction by the School District and  the Philadelphia Industrial Development Corporation (PIDC). Scout was selected as the developer in September 2014 and proposed converting the building into a new destination for makers, creatives, innovators and entrepreneurs. The building was redeveloped for commercial use in the creative sector, including both offices and workshops, as well as restaurants and a bar.

Academic programs
Programs were designed to develop students into well-rounded individuals. In addition to regular academic and vocational course offerings, there were specialized programs in Business Technology 
Computer Assisted Design (CAD), Construction Trades, Culinary Arts, Computer/Networking, Health Related Sciences, Process Technology and Welding.

Auto mechanics was also an elective. The 1967 alumni class included known Mixologist,              John C. Lackey.

Bok offered men's and women's interscholastic sports including: football, baseball, basketball, soccer, softball, track and field, volleyball, badminton, cheerleading, drill, team, and weight training. After School Clubs provided special enrichment activities for students. Bok was the only community high school in the city housing programs such as Sunrise of Philadelphia, Inc. and Variety the Children's Charity

Recognition
As of 2010, Bok had achieved Adequate Yearly Progress (AYP) for 5 years straight. It has since been determined that their principal, Arthur "Larry" Melton, altered test answers to obtain that distinction. Their scores predictably returned to pre-scandal levels once Melton was convicted of cheating on the PSSA (Pennsylvania System of School Assessment).

Notable alumni
Sherman Hemsley, Actor
Willie McClung, former NFL player
Jihad Ward, NFL player
Bunny Sigler Class of 1959, Philly Soul singer, songwriter and producer

References

External links

 - 2008-2012
 - 1997-2007
Bok Building website
Building history

High schools in Philadelphia
School buildings on the National Register of Historic Places in Philadelphia
Public high schools in Pennsylvania
1938 establishments in Pennsylvania
South Philadelphia
Defunct schools in Pennsylvania